Robert Barnwell Rhett (born Robert Barnwell Smith; December 21, 1800September 14, 1876) was an American politician who served as a deputy from South Carolina to the Provisional Confederate States Congress from 1861 to 1862, a member of the US House of Representatives from South Carolina from 1837 to 1849, and US Senator from South Carolina from 1850 to 1852. As a staunch supporter of slavery and an early advocate of secession, he was a "Fire-Eater". He was given the nickname, the "father of succession".

Rhett published his views through his newspaper, the Charleston Mercury.

Early life
Rhett was born Robert Barnwell Smith in Beaufort, South Carolina, United States. He later studied law.

Rhett was of English ancestry. On his mother's side, he was related to U.S. Representative Robert Barnwell (his great-uncle) and Senator Robert Woodward Barnwell (son of Robert). A cousin of the Barnwells was the wife of Alexander Garden.

Early career
Rhett  was a member of the South Carolina legislature  from 1826 until 1832, and was extremely pro-slavery in his views. At the end of the Nullification Crisis in 1833, he told the South Carolina Nullification Convention:

In 1832, Rhett became South Carolina's Attorney General, serving until 1837. He was then elected a US Representative and served until 1849. In 1838, he changed his last name from Smith to that of a prominent colonial ancestor, Colonel William Rhett.

Rhett objected vehemently to the protectionist Tariff of 1842.

Support for secession
On July 31, 1844, Rhett launched the Bluffton Movement, which called for South Carolina to return to nullification or else declare secession. It was soon repudiated by more moderate South Carolina Democrats, including even Senator John C. Calhoun, who feared it would endanger the presidential candidacy of James K. Polk.

Rhett opposed the Compromise of 1850 as against the interests of the slave-holding South. He joined fellow Fire-Eaters at the Nashville Convention of 1850, which failed to endorse his aim of secession for the whole South. After the Nashville Convention, Rhett, William Lowndes Yancey, and a few others met in Macon, Georgia on August 21, 1850, and formed the short-lived Southern National Party. In December 1850, he was appointed to be a U.S. Senator to complete the term left by the death of Calhoun. He continued to advocate secession in response to the Compromise, but in 1852, South Carolina refrained from declaring secession and merely passed an ordinance declaring a state's right to secede. Disappointed, he resigned his Senate seat.

He continued to express his fiery secessionist sentiments through the Charleston Mercury, now edited by his son, Robert Jr.

The 1860 Democratic National Convention met in Charleston, South Carolina and a large bloc of Southern delegates walked out when the platform was insufficiently pro-slavery. That led to the division of the party and separate Northern and Southern nominees for president, which practically guaranteed the election of an anti-slavery Republican, which in turn triggered declarations of secession in seven states. During the 1860 presidential campaign, a widely credited report in the Nashville Patriot said that the outcome was the intended result of a conspiracy by Rhett, Yancey, and William Porcher Miles hatched at the Southern Convention in Montgomery, Alabama in May 1858.

Confederate States
After the election of the Republican Party's candidate, Abraham Lincoln, Rhett was elected to the South Carolina Secession Convention, which declared secession in December. He was chosen as deputy from South Carolina to the Provisional Confederate States Congress in Montgomery. He was one of the most active deputies and was the chairman of the committee that reported the Confederate States Constitution. He was then elected to the Confederate House of Representatives. He received no higher office in the Confederate government and returned to South Carolina. During the rest of the Civil War, he sharply criticized the policies of Confederate President Jefferson Davis.

Death
After the war, Rhett settled in Louisiana.  He died in St. James Parish, Louisiana, and is interred at Magnolia Cemetery in Charleston, South Carolina.

Legacy
The Robert Barnwell Rhett House in Charleston was declared a National Historic Landmark in 1973.

See also

List of slave owners
List of United States representatives from South Carolina
List of United States senators from South Carolina

References
Notes

Further reading

Scarborough, William K., "Propagandists for Secession: Edmund Ruffin of Virginia and Robert Barnwell Rhett of South Carolina", South Carolina Historical Magazine 112 (July–Oct. 2011), 126–38.
White, Laura A. (1931) Robert Barnwell Rhett: Father of Secession

External links

Robert Rhett at The Political Graveyard

1800 births
1876 deaths
19th-century American newspaper publishers (people)
19th-century American politicians
American planters
American proslavery activists
American slave owners
Burials in South Carolina
Democratic Party members of the United States House of Representatives from South Carolina
Democratic Party United States senators from South Carolina
Deputies and delegates to the Provisional Congress of the Confederate States
Members of the Confederate House of Representatives from South Carolina
Democratic Party members of the South Carolina House of Representatives
Nullification crisis
People from Beaufort, South Carolina
Signers of the Confederate States Constitution
Signers of the Provisional Constitution of the Confederate States
South Carolina Attorneys General
South Carolina lawyers
American Fire-Eaters
American white supremacists
Burials at Magnolia Cemetery (Charleston, South Carolina)
United States senators who owned slaves